Hebei Zhuoao F.C. is defunct Chinese football club. They were based in Qinhuangdao, Hebei. The Chinese Football School Stadium was their home venue. It had partnership with Brazilian football club Olé Brasil Futebol Clube through youth programs, in which they send selected, promising Chinese youth players to train abroad there.

History
Hebei Jingying F.C. was established in 2009 by Hebei Jingying Group.

It aims to contribute to the development of Chinese football through organizing programs to send selected Chinese youth players to Brazil to train abroad through their advanced methods, and sent out their first group of players in 2009. 

In December 2010, the club signed a partnership contract with Brazilian side Olé Brasil Futebol Clube, a football club based in Ribeirão Preto, São Paolo and are known for its youth training programs, and sent out their second group of youth players to train abroad there.

After the return of their first group of players sent out in 2010, the club enrolled in 2014 China League Two, and has remained in the same level ever since. 

In 2019, they changed their name to Hebei Aoli Jingying F.C..

The club was dissolved after 2021 season.

Name history

Results
All-time league rankings

As of the end of 2019 season.

 in North Group.

Key
 Pld = Played
 W = Games won
 D = Games drawn
 L = Games lost
 F = Goals for
 A = Goals against
 Pts = Points
 Pos = Final position

 DNQ = Did not qualify
 DNE = Did not enter
 NH = Not Held
 – = Does Not Exist
 R1 = Round 1
 R2 = Round 2
 R3 = Round 3
 R4 = Round 4

 F = Final
 SF = Semi-finals
 QF = Quarter-finals
 R16 = Round of 16
 Group = Group stage
 GS2 = Second Group stage
 QR1 = First Qualifying Round
 QR2 = Second Qualifying Round
 QR3 = Third Qualifying Round

References

External links
Soccerway

Association football clubs established in 2009
Association football clubs disestablished in 2022
Defunct football clubs in China
2009 establishments in China
2022 disestablishments in China